Yvick Letexier (born 14 August 1993), better known as Mister V, is a French YouTuber, Internet personality, comedian, rapper, and actor. In 2014, he founded with six other young comedians (Hugo Dessioux, Jéremie Dethelot, Youssoupha Diaby, Hakim Jemili, Mike Kenli and MalcolmToTheWord) whose Le Woop, a collective of comedians who post their videos on YouTube, and also plays on stage. He is of Cameroonian descent from his mother's side and his father is Breton.

He worked alongside Norman Thavaud, Hugo Dessioux, and other French YouTubers in Le Studio Bagel.

Mister V debuted atop the French SNEP albums chart in May 2017 with his debut album, Double V. His second album, MVP, also reached number-one in early 2020.

Discography

Albums

Singles

Featured singles

Other charting songs

Filmography

Film

Web series

Television
2013-2015: Le Dézapping du Before on Canal+
2013: Le Débarquement on Canal+
2016: Le tour du Bagel on Canal+
2016: Le Woop: Mission Grand Rex on C8
2016: Fort Boyard on France 2
2018: Norbert commis d'office on 6ter

Shows
2012: Le Zapping Amazing, at the Grand Rex (with La Ferme Jérome, Cyprien, Le Palmashow, Kemar, Julfou, Julien Donzé, PV Nova, Spicy Marguerites, Volt, Backstage Rodéo)
2013: Le Zapping Amazing 2 (French tour)
2014-2016: Le Woop sur scène (French tour)
2015: Le Woop at the Bataclan
2016: Le Woop'' at the Grand Rex

Videography
Dailymotion
2008-2010: La Wii / 17 ans / La philosophie / Les comédies musicales

YouTube
2010: L'éducation sexuelle / Jean Michel Pokora / Les 5 photos de profil Facebook
2011: Être en couple / La politique / Colonel Crado - "Toutes les nuits" (Colonel Reyel) [Parodie] / Le métissage / Les 5 nouvelles photos de profil / Mc Jacky - Le rap des clichés / Secret Story / Le bac / La bagarre / Le basketball / Le permis de conduire
2012: Les boîtes de nuit / Être célibataire / Être célibataire (soft version for kids) / Trouver un job / Partir en vacances / La danse
2012 (in partnership with M6 Mobile): Les jeux vidéo / Les super-héros / Les vampires / Les bonnes résolutions
2013: Le mystère de l'épaule gauche / Le rap / Los Angeles (feat. Cyprien & La Ferme Jérôme) / Le cannabis / Le R'n'B
2014: La police / Dormir
2015: Avoir un gosse / McWalter
2016: McWalter et la menace Kibuja (Parts 1 & 2) / Les States / Le service / Rap vs. Réalité
2017: Faire un album / La police 2 / Faire un album La suite
2018: McWalter 3 / Le Québec
2019: J'ai 25 ans / Le rap vs la réalité 2
2020: Faire un album 2
2021: La police 3
2022: La Pizza delamama 

Studio Bagel
2012-2013 (Season 1): BagelField: serviette / Marre de te faire recaler en boîte? / Le mariage gay / La Crise: Noël 2012 / Le Raid: Au cœur de l'action / 200 000 Abonnés: Clip / L'incroyable destin de Wilfried Destin / L'Inside: le Tatouage / L'Inside: Le Tour de magie / Et si l'alcool ne faisait plus effet? / Frenchies in Vegas: Clip
2013-2014 (Season 2): C'était le Studio Bagel: escabeau / En couple sur Facebook?: Miguel / Le Gang des Clowns: Le présentateur TV / La Friendzone: Steven, l'ami gay / L'ultime recours / La beauféthie: Denis (Personnage Principal)
2014-2015 (Season 3): Déjà vu: Le meilleur ami du héros / La soirée / Le Casting du Studio Bagel: Lui-même / Pas très Charlie / Le Bucket (with Kevin Razy) (Sketch show)
2015-2017 (Le Tour du Bagel): High Crous Musical: Régis / Ratatouille: Fred / Clash d’astéroïde: Young Chapo2paille / Shooter: Shooter

Notes

References

External links
 
 
 

1993 births
French people of Breton descent
French people of Cameroonian descent
French humorists
French YouTubers
French rappers
Living people
Musicians from Grenoble
Comedy YouTubers
21st-century French male actors
YouTube channels launched in 2008
Music YouTubers